Drunken Trees is the debut release by Swedish folk duo First Aid Kit. It was released on 9 April 2008 in Sweden via Rabid Records, followed by a UK release via Wichita Records on 23 February 2009. The UK release features the band's cover of Fleet Foxes' "Tiger Mountain Peasant Song" as a bonus track, in addition to videos of "Our Own Pretty Ways", "Jagadamba, You Might" and "You're Not Coming Home Tonight".

Track listing

All tracks written by Klara and Johanna Söderberg except where noted.

Reception

Drunken Trees attracted attention largely from independent music journalists, whose response was generally positive.

The Skinny gave the EP a score of 4/5, writing that "these two have world-weary voices far beyond their years, in the same way that Dylan did when he was 21...an understated acoustic gem." Allmusic, meanwhile, were more reserved, writing that while the band "sing in full, earthy, expressive tones that belie their years", they are "still in the process of refining their craft, and still taking plenty of cues from other artists".

Credits
 Klara and Johanna Söderberg - production, vocals, instrumentation, design & artwork
 Benkt Söderberg - production
 Joachim Ekkerman - mixing
 Håkan Åkesson - mastering

References

2008 debut EPs
Folk EPs
First Aid Kit (band) albums